There are over 20,000 Grade II* listed buildings in England. This page is a list of these buildings in the district of Weymouth and Portland in the county of Dorset.

Buildings

|}

See also
Grade I listed buildings in Dorset

Notes

External links

Lists of Grade II* listed buildings in Dorset